Rondonops xanthomystax is a species of lizard in the family Gymnophthalmidae. It is endemic to Brazil.

References

Rondonops
Reptiles of Brazil
Endemic fauna of Brazil
Reptiles described in 2015
Taxa named by Guarino R. Colli
Taxa named by Marinus Steven Hoogmoed
Taxa named by David C. Cannatella
Taxa named by José Cassimiro
Taxa named by Jerriane O. Gomes
Taxa named by Jose Mario B. Ghellere
Taxa named by Pedro M. Sales-Nunes
Taxa named by Kátia Cristina Machado Pellegrino
Taxa named by Patricia E. Salerno
Taxa named by Sergio M. Souza
Taxa named by Miguel Trefaut Rodrigues